Lunel may refer to:

People
 Armand Lunel (1892–1977), French writer
 Folquet de Lunel (1244–1300), French troubadour
 Gerard of Lunel (1275—1298), French saint
 Magali Lunel (born 1975), French journalist and television personality

Places
 Canton of Lunel, France
 Lunel, Hérault, France
 Lunel-Viel, Hérault, France